Mantidactylus zipperi is a species of frog in the family Mantellidae.
It is endemic to Madagascar.
Its natural habitat is pristine or only slightly disturbed rainforest. It is usually found near streams. It is threatened by habitat loss.

References

zipperi
Endemic frogs of Madagascar
Taxonomy articles created by Polbot
Amphibians described in 2004